The Cape Fear Public Transportation Authority, operating as Wave Transit, is the public transportation operator for the metro area of Wilmington, North Carolina. Sixteen regular routes are provided, with all but one running seven days per week. A free downtown shuttle also runs using road trolleys.

History
Created in 1974, the Wilmington Transit Authority (WTA) was implemented to provide public transportation to the citizens of the Wilmington area.

In December 2002, the WTA adopted the name Wave, as well as a new logo and color scheme for the Authority.

Rapid sprawl and rising traffic congestion throughout the region led the City of Wilmington and New Hanover County to enter into an historic agreement in June 2003. The city and county merged the WTA and New Hanover Transportation Services to form the Wilmington/New Hanover Transportation Agency (WNHTA). This agreement merged the respective organizations for one year, in order to provide oversight of both agencies under one public transportation authority.

In July 2004 the WNHTA, the WTA and NHTS were dissolved and a new transportation authority was created. The merged entity officially became the Cape Fear Public Transportation Authority, but retained the branded name of Wave Transit.

In an effort to better serve the community, in 2011, Wave Transit restructured all fixed routes in the region. The new routes were based on a modern transfer facility, Forden Station, which is centrally located within the service area. Expanded service required additional infrastructure, and a 36,000 square foot Wave Transit Operations Center was built to house a maintenance shop, bus garage, fueling station, and serve as the epicenter of service operation.  The Operations Center opened in June 2015. The most recent improvement, a downtown multimodal transportation center, Padgett Station, replaced an open air transfer point on 2nd St in January 2020.

Route list

Fixed Route:

Seahawk Shuttle:

704 Yellow Route - every 20 minutes

711 Grey Route - every 20 minutes

707 Red Express Route - every 20 minutes

Port City Trolley:

Route 203 - every 40 minutes

RideMICRO:

Brunswick-Downtown Connector - on-demand

Pender - New Hanover Connector - on-demand

Southern New Hanover County - on-demand

Northern New Hanover County - on-demand

Stations

Forden Station

Forden Station is a bus station located in Wilmington's North College neighborhood and serves as a bus terminus for the Cape Fear Public Transportation Authority (Wave) and provides intercity bus service via Amtrak Thruway and Greyhound Lines. At an estimated cost of $5.4 million, the facility opened on April 18, 2011.

Amtrak Thruway service 

The Amtrak Thruway bus departs Wilmington at Forden Station and connects to train service at the Amtrak Station in Wilson, N.C.

Daily rail service is available for travel to 20 stations between New York and Savannah, Ga., as well the Amtrak national network serving more than 500 stations in 46 states, the District of Columbia and three Canadian provinces.  The Palmetto Train 89 (NYP – SAV) departs the Wilson Station at 2:22 p.m. and Palmetto Train 90 (SAV – NYP) departs the Wilson Station at 2:23 p.m. ATK-12-074.

Passengers may book travel by calling 1-800-USA-RAIL. Tickets are also available on Amtrak.com and the mobile app. Amtrak tickets cannot be purchased at Forden Station.

Greyhound lines 
Six daily routes with service throughout the contiguous United States currently operate out of Forden Station.

Padgett Station

Padgett Station is a multimodal transit facility that located in Wilmington's Upper Downtown neighborhood at 520 North 3rd St, and serves as a bus terminus for the Cape Fear Public Transportation Authority (Wave). Named after former Wilmington City Council member Laura W. Padgett, it was opened on January 18, 2020.  It is the first phase of a larger multimodal transportation project. The station permanently replaced the Authority’s Downtown Transfer Station located at 2nd Street and Princess Street.  The upgraded amenities at Padgett Station offer customers and visitors a safer, more convenient, and more accessible experience when utilizing public transportation services.  The project was a collaborative effort between the City of Wilmington, the Wilmington Metropolitan Planning Organization (WMPO), and the Cape Fear Public Transportation Authority (Wave Transit).

References

External links

 Cape Fear Public Transit in Wilmington, North Carolina – Greyhound

1974 establishments in North Carolina
Bus transportation in North Carolina
Transportation in New Hanover County, North Carolina
Wilmington, North Carolina